Paola Moro (born 14 August 1952) is a retired female long-distance runner from Italy.

Biography
She competed for her native country at the 1984 Summer Olympics in Los Angeles, California. There she ended up in 20th place in the women's marathon. Moro set her personal best in the classic distance (2:33.03) in 1984.

Achievements
All results regarding marathon, unless stated otherwise

External links
 

1952 births
Living people
Italian female long-distance runners
Italian female marathon runners
Olympic athletes of Italy
Athletes (track and field) at the 1984 Summer Olympics
Sportspeople from the Province of Vicenza
20th-century Italian women
21st-century Italian women